Hot 98.3 FM is a Nigerian radio station that broadcasts on the 98.3 FM frequency from Abuja, in Nigeria's Federal Capital Territory. It started broadcasting on March 1, 2005.

Hot 98.3 FM is licensed to broadcast to the entire North Central Zone (middle belt region) of the country. It broadcasts a mix of adult contemporary music and news/talk programming.

History 
Hot FM was founded in January 2005. It is owned and operated by Spectrum Broadcasting Co. Nig Ltd.

External links 
Hot FM Abuja website
Live Audio Feed
Station listing on AudioRealm
Hot FM's Official Facebook page

Radio stations in Nigeria
Radio stations established in 2005
Mass media in Abuja